Gladstone Secondary School is a public secondary school located in the Kensington-Cedar Cottage neighbourhood in Vancouver, British Columbia, Canada.  It is named after William Ewart Gladstone, the Prime Minister of the United Kingdom four times between 1868 and 1894.

History
Gladstone is built on property that was once an old farm. The location was designated for a school in the late 1920s, but because of the Great Depression and Second World War, construction did not begin until 1949.

Gladstone opened as a junior high school in 1950 with an enrollment of 1376 students. Mr. D.B. Mackenzie, who was Gladstone's first principal, opened the sliding gym doors to symbolize the opening of the school at a ceremony attended by all staff members and students.
From the opening year in 1950, Gladstone added a grade each year until the first class graduated in 1954. Since then, many students have been through Gladstone's doors.

Current
Gladstone is a school of approximately 950 students from grades 8-12. The students participate in many extracurricular activities, including clubs and sports teams.

Sports 
Gladstone is well known for its successful sports teams (e.g. Volleyball, Basketball, Badminton). and its participation in competitions related to engineering (Electrathon, Robotics). Gladstone's Fine Arts department is also highly regarded, with especially strong Music, Drama, and Dance programs.

Gladstone is a participant in the Think & Eat Green @ School program, designed to enrich student knowledge of sustainable food practices. Gladstone's focus in this project is on the redesign and infrastructural change to the kitchen and cafeteria. Gladstone was also featured in Season 1, Episode 7 of 21 Jump Street.

Academics
Gladstone has a diverse array of academic courses and programs that provide students with a range of educational options for them to pursue. The school offers three Advanced Placement courses in English, Calculus and Chemistry. Gladstone used to offer a Montessori program; however, this program ended in 2010.

Mini-School
There are two streams offered by Mini-School: Humanities (consisting of English, Social Studies, Core French, and PE Leadership) and Mathematics-Science (consisting of Math and Science). Most students applying for the Gladstone Mini-School choose full stream Mini-School, which consists of all 6 of the aforementioned classes. Prospective applicants are required to take a test to show their multiple academic abilities as well as submit a portfolio.

Notable alumni
Warren Cann
Wayson Choy, author
Ken Lum, visual artist
Nelson Skalbania

In popular culture
The TV show Supernatural used Gladstone as a shooting location in November 2015

The tv show 21 Jumpstreet used the school as a shooting location and the episode aired in May of 1997. Season 1 episode 7 "Gotta Finish the Riff" was the episode name.

Timetable
Gladstone Secondary School operates on a linear timetable on semester rotation, from September to December and January to June. Each day has four blocks: four blocks of  1 hour and 22 minutes with FIT Time (Flexible Instructional Time) every Tuesday and Thursday, with Tuesday having morning FIT and Thursday having afternoon FIT. Each FIT time has a length of 50 minutes. Each day of classes begin at 8:40 a.m. and end at 3:06 p.m. (Monday to Friday).

References

External links

Vancouver School Board: Gladstone

High schools in Vancouver
Educational institutions established in 1950
1950 establishments in British Columbia